Degva is a rural locality (a selo) in Sergokalinsky District, Republic of Dagestan, Russia. The population was 824 as of 2010. There is 1 street.

Geography 
Degva is located 15 km southwest of Sergokala (the district's administrative centre) by road, on the Kakaozen river. Chakhimakhi and Aymazamakhi are the nearest rural localities.

Nationalities 
Dargins live there.

References 

Rural localities in Sergokalinsky District